Andrewsianthus is a genus of liverworts in the family Lophoziaceae.

Species include:
Andrewsianthus aberrans
Andrewsianthus australis
Andrewsianthus bidens
Andrewsianthus bilobus
Andrewsianthus cavifolius
Andrewsianthus cuspidatus
Andrewsianthus ferrugineus Grolle
Andrewsianthus hodgsoniae
Andrewsianthus jamesonii
Andrewsianthus kilimanjaricus
Andrewsianthus koponenii
Andrewsianthus perigonialis
Andrewsianthus puniceus
Andrewsianthus scabrellus
Andrewsianthus sphenoloboides
Andrewsianthus squarrosus

The genus name of Andrewsianthus is in honour of Albert LeRoy Andrews (1878-1962) an American professor of Germanic philology and an avocational bryologist, known as "one of the world’s foremost bryologists and the American authority on Sphagnaceae.

References

Jungermanniales
Jungermanniales genera
Taxonomy articles created by Polbot